The 2022 Horizon League baseball tournament will be held from May 25 through 28. The winner of the tournament will earn the conference's automatic bid to the 2022 NCAA Division I baseball tournament.

Seeding and format
The league's teams will be seeded one through six based on winning percentage, using conference games only.  The bottom four seeds will participate in a play-in round, with winners advancing to a double-elimination tournament also including the top two seeds.

Bracket

Play-In Round

Double-Elimination Rounds

Schedule

References

Horizon League Baseball Tournament
Tournament
Horizon League baseball tournament